The Seattle Mariners' 2001 season was the 25th since the franchise's inception. They finished with a  record, tying the major league record for wins set by the 1906 Chicago Cubs, and setting the record for wins by an American League team. Of those wins, 59 were by four or more runs, a record for the number of games won by such a margin. They also led the majors in both runs scored and fewest runs allowed.

The 2001 season was also notable for the Major League debut of star Japanese outfielder Ichiro Suzuki, who led the league in batting average and won both the AL Rookie of the Year and the AL MVP awards. Additionally, the Mariners hosted their second All-Star Game during the season. 

Winning the American League West division, the 2001 season marked the first (and to date, only) time the Mariners reached the postseason in consecutive seasons. The team defeated the Cleveland Indians in the American League Division Series in five games, but fell to the New York Yankees in five games in the American League Championship Series. They became the first team in MLB history to win 110 or more regular season games and fail to reach the World Series. They would later be joined in this regard by the 2022 Los Angeles Dodgers.

Despite the record-setting win total, the Mariners would not reach the postseason again until 2022, which was the longest active drought in the four major North American sports.

Offseason
November 7, 2000: Scott Podsednik was signed as a free agent with the Seattle Mariners.

November 18, 2000: Ichiro Suzuki was signed as a free agent with the Seattle Mariners.

December 22, 2000: Bret Boone was signed as a free agent with the Seattle Mariners.

Regular season

Roster

Season standings

Detailed records

Record vs. opponents

Game log: 116–46 (Home: 57–24; Road: 59–22)

All-Star Game

The Mariners hosted the 2001 Major League Baseball All-Star Game on July 10, 2001 at Safeco Field. It was the second time the Mariners hosted the Midsummer Classic, and the first at Safeco Field. Eight Mariners were in the game, including four in the starting lineup. The game resulted in the American League defeating the National League by the final score of 4–1. This would be the final All-Star Game for Cal Ripken Jr. and Tony Gwynn.

Player stats

Batting

Starters by position
Note: Pos = Position; G = Games played; AB = At bats; H = Hits; Avg. = Batting average; HR = Home runs; RBI = Runs batted in; SB = Stolen bases

Other batters
Note: G = Games played; AB = At bats; H = Hits; Avg. = Batting average; HR = Home runs; RBI = Runs batted in; SB = Stolen bases

Pitching

Starting pitchers
Note: G = Games pitched; GS = Games started; IP = Innings pitched; W = Wins; L = Losses; ERA = Earned run average; SO = Strikeouts

Other pitchers
Note: G = Games pitched; GS = Games started; IP = Innings pitched; W = Wins; L = Losses; ERA = Earned run average; SO = Strikeouts

Relief pitchers
Note: G = Games pitched; IP = Innings pitched; W = Wins; L = Losses; SV = Saves; SVO = Save opportunities; ERA = Earned run average; SO = Strikeouts

Postseason

ALDS

ALCS

Postseason Game log: 4–6 (Home: 2–3; Road: 2–3)

Awards and records
Bret Boone, Most RBIs in one season by an American League Second Baseman (141)
 Ichiro Suzuki, American League Most Valuable Player
 Ichiro Suzuki, American League Rookie of the Year
 Ichiro Suzuki, American League Batting Champion
 Ichiro Suzuki, American League Stolen Base Leader
 Freddy García, American League ERA Leader
 Lou Piniella, Manager of the Year

All-Star Game

 John Olerud, first base, starter
 Bret Boone, second base, starter
 Ichiro Suzuki, outfield, starter
 Edgar Martínez, designated hitter, starter
 Mike Cameron, outfield, reserve
 Freddy García, pitcher, reserve
 Jeff Nelson, pitcher, reserve
 Kazuhiro Sasaki, pitcher, reserve

Farm system

LEAGUE CO-CHAMPIONS: Tacoma

Major League Baseball Draft 

The following is a list of 2001 Seattle Mariners draft picks. The Mariners took part in the June regular draft, also known as the Rule 4 draft. The Mariners made 52 selections in the 2001 draft, the first being shortstop Michael Garciaparra in the first round. In all, the Mariners selected 23 pitchers, 13 outfielders, 7 catchers, 5 shortstops, 2 third basemen, 1 first baseman, and 1 second baseman.

Draft

Key

Table

References

External links

2001 Seattle Mariners at Baseball Reference
2001 Seattle Mariners at Baseball Almanac
 

Seattle Mariners seasons
Seattle Mariners season
American League West champion seasons
2001 in sports in Washington (state)